Below the programs previously aired by Southern Broadcasting Network and ETC. Broadcasts a variety of programming through its UHF terrestrial television station SBN-TV 21 Manila. For the current shows on SolarFlix of this network, see List of programs broadcast by SolarFlix.

Local defunct shows

News
 Ito Ang Balita (2002-2004)
 Philippine Headline News (1992-2007)
 PSE Live: The Stock Market Today (1995-1998)
 Solar Daybreak1  (2012–2013)
 Solar Headlines1  (2012–2013)
 Solar Network News1  (2012–2013)
 Solar News Cebuano1  (2013)
 Solar Newsday1  (2012–2013)
 Solar Nightly News1  (2012-2013)
 Solar Sports Desk1  (2012–2013)

Public affairs
 Biblia at Balita (2001)
 Elections 20131 (2012-2013)
 Fora Medica
 Gabay at Aksyon
 Inform In 100 (Election Special Reports)1 (2013)
 Legal at Espiritual (2001)
 Legal Help Desk1 (2012-2013)
 MedTalk1 (2012-2013)
 The New Bob Garon Debates (2001)
 News Café1 (2012-2013)
 News.PH1 (2012-2013)
 Opposing Views1 (2013)
 TownHall: The Solar News-PPCRV Election Series1  (2013)
 Usapang Legal with Willie (2006-2007)

Informative
 Amazing Lifestyle (2001-2003)
 Barangay Uniting For Chess (2006-2007)
 Buhay Pelota (2003-2007)
 Buhay Pinoy (2002-2007)
 ETC Hotlist1
 ETC Location1
 ETC Vibe1 (2008-2011, 2013-2016)
 Morning! Umaga Na! (2006-2007)
 Something to Chew On1 (2013)
 What I See1 (2012–2013)

Entertainment
 Celebrity Night of Dance and Music (2006-2007)
 Chill Spot1 (2008-2009)
 Cyber Jam (1996-1999)
 ETC HQ (December 3, 2013)
 ETCETERA1 (2013-2015)
 For Women Only
 Friday Night Live (2001)
 Gen M1 (2010-2011)
 The Journey to the Crown1 (2016-2017)
 Let The Music Live (2001)
 Rated Oh!1
 SBN 21 Live (1996-2001)
 Stylized (2014)
 World TV Mag (1992-1996)
 XYZ Young Women's TV

Reality
 I Am Meg (2013-2015)
 Mega Fashion Crew (2013-2014)
 Project Runway Philippines1 (2008-2009, 2015)

Religious
 Ang Dating Daan (1998-2004)
 Ang Tamang Daan (2001-2004)
 Bible Quiz Bee (2001)
 Bible Stories : Comics on T.V. (2001)
 Friends Again (2003-2007)
 Give Us This Day! with Pastor Apollo C. Quiboloy (now aired on SMNI)
 Jesus: Lord Of The Nations (2004-2007)
 Kerygma TV (2004-2007)
 Oras ng Himala (2001-2007)
 Oras ng Katotohanan (2004-2007)
 Tinig ng Kanyang Pagbabalik (2004-2007)

Other programs
 Eventure (2001)
 The H-Files (2001)

Movie blocks/specials
 ETC A-List (2008-2011)
 ETCinema (2020-2022)
 ETC Flix (2013-2018, 2020-2022)
 ETC Music Specials
 ETC Presents
 Mondays Hollywood Big Hits
 Thursday Ninja Specials
 Tuesday War Movies
 Wednesday Sci-Fi Theatre

Music
 SBN Karaoke (2001-2006)
 SBN Music Videos (2000-2007)

TV shopping
 EZ Shop (2022)
 Home Shopping Network (2004-2007)
 Metro TV
 New Life TV Shopping
 Sell-A-Vision
 The Quantum Channel (1996-2005)
 TV Window Shop
 Value Vision (1998-2007)
 Winner TV Shopping

Sports
 Jai-Alai Games (2003)
 World TV Boxing

1in cooperation with ETC/Talk TV/Solar News Channel

Foreign defunct shows
 2 Broke Girls (2013–2017)
 20/20
 The 5th Wheel1
 60 Minutes1 (2012–2013)
 The A-List
 A to Z (2014–2015)
 ABC World News
 The Adventures of Wonder Woman
 Age of Love1
 Ambush Makeover1
 American Dreams1 
 American Idol 1 (2014–16, 2018–19)
 America's Funniest Home Videos
 America's Funniest People
 America's Next Top Model1 (2008–2011, 2013–2015, 2016–present)
 Anderson Live1 (2011–2013)
 The Arsenio Hall Show
 Assignment: Earth
 Average Joe1
 B-fighter
 B-fighter Kabuto
 The Bachelor1
 The Bachelor: Rome1
 Bachelor Pad1
 The Bachelorette1
 The Bad Girls Club
 Beauty & the Beast1 (2013–2016)
 Beauty and the Geek
 Blind Date
 Blood, Sweat & Heels
 Brave New Girls
 Breaking Up with Shannen Doherty
 Built1 (2014)
 Candid Camera
 Candidly Nicole
 Camp1 
 The Carrie Diaries1 (2013–2014)
 The Catalina1 
 Celebrity Night of Music and Dance
 Change of Heart
 Changeman
 Chasing Maria Menounos1
 Chelsea Lately1 (2008–2010)
 Child's Play
 City Girl Diaries1 (2014)
 The Class1
 CNN Headline News
 CNN Showbiz
 CNN World News
 Complete Savages
 The Daily 101 (2008–2011)
 Dates
 Date My Mom1
 Dateline NBC1 (2011)
 Dirty Dancing1
 The Dish1
 Dracula (2015)
 Dress My Nest
 Dukes of Melrose
 E! News1 (2008–2011)
 Early Today1 (2011–2013)
 Earthwatch
 Ed1
 ElimiDate
 Emergency Call
 Emily Owens, M.D.1
 Entourage1
 Everwood1
 EWTN
 Eye Candy1
 Farmer Wants a Wife1
 The Fashion Fund
 The Fashion Show
 Finding Carter
 The Flying Doctors
 Foody Call1
 For the Juniors
 For Love or Money1
 Formal Wars1 (2014–2015)
 Four Weddings
 Freddie1
 Friday Night Lights1
 Friends1 (2008–2011, 2013–2014)
 Friends with Better Lives1
 Froggy Call1
 Gallery Girls1 
 The Game1
 Gerber
 Girls Behaving Badly1
 The Girls of the Playboy Mansion1
 Glee1 (2009–2011, 2013–2015)
 Good Morning, Miami1
 Gossip Girl1 (2008–2011)
 Here Come the Newlyweds1 (2009–2010)
 High School Confidential
 High School Reunion1
 Hindsight
 House of Carters1
 Hot Guys Who Cook
 How I Met Your Mother1 (2008–2011)
 I Propose
 Inside Edition1 
 The Insider1 (2013–2017)
 Is She Really Going Out With Him?
 iZombie (2015–present)
 Jake in Progress (2008–2009)
 The Jamie Kennedy Experiment1
 Joan of Arcadia1 (2008)
 Just Say No
 Keeping Up with the Kardashians1 (2008–2011)
 Kendra (2010–2011)
 Kitchen Confidential1
 Knock First1
 Launch My Line1 (2010–2011)
 Late Night with Conan O'Brien1
 Late Show with David Letterman1 
 The Lying Game1 (2014)
 Make Me a Supermodel1
 Married Away
 Masked Rider Black
 Material Girl1
 Meet My Folks1
 The Millionaire Matchmaker1 (2009–2011, 2013–2016)
 Miss Advised1
 MLB on World TV
 Mr. Squiggle and Friends
 Models NYC (2009)
 Models of the Runway (2010–2011)
 Mondays Hollywood Big Hits
 Momma's Boys1 (2010)
 Movie Juice
 Mulligrubs
 My Boys
 My Crazy Love (2015)
 NBC Nightly News1 
 New Girl (2013–2018)
 New Life TV Shopping
 New York Fashion Week: Catwalk Review
 New Zoo Revue
 Newshour
 The Next Big Thing: New York1 
 Nightline
 Nikita1
 Nip/Tuck1
 NYC Prep1 (2010–2011)
 The O.C.1
 One Tree Hill1 (2008–2011)
 Open House Overhaul
 The Originals1 (2013–2018)
 Outback Jack1
 Parental Control1
 The Phil Donahue Show
 Pitch
 Playschool
 Powerless
 Pretty Little Liars1 (2010–2011, 2013–2017)
 Pretty Wicked1 (2010)
 Primetime Live
 Privileged1 (2009–2010)
 Project Runway1 (2008–2011; 2013–present)
 Project Runway: All Stars
 Project Runway: Threads
 Project Runway: Under The Gunn (2015–2016)
 Pussycat Dolls Present: Girlicious
 Pussycat Dolls Present: The Search for the Next Doll1
 Quarterlife1
 Queer Eye For The Straight Guy1
 The Rachel Zoe Project1 (2009–2011; 2014)
 Randy Jackson Presents America's Best Dance Crew1
 Ravenswood1 
 Ready For Love1
 Relationship Rehab
 SBN Music Videos (Sony and BMG)
 Sally Jessy Raphaël / Sally
 Saturday Night Live1
 Seinfeld1
 Selfie (2015)
 Sell-a-Vision
 Sexiest1
 Shear Genius1
 The Shepherd's Voice
 The Simple Life1
 Snoop Dogg's Father Hood1
 Solar News Channel Presents: Stories1 (2013)
 The Spectacular World of Guinness Records
 Split Ends1
 Stalker (2014–2015)
 Star-Crossed1 (2014)
 Step It Up and Dance1
 Super Bowl
 Super Fun Night1 (2013–2014)
 Super Rescue Solbrain
 Superboy
 Takeshi's Castle
 The Talk1 (2011–2013)
 Thursday Ninja Specials
 Tim Gunn's Guide to Style1
 Titans1 (2012)
 TMZ1 (2008–2011, 2013–2018)
 TMZ Weekend (2008–2009)
 The Tudors
 The Today Show1 (2011–2013)
 Today Weekend1 (2011–2013)
 Today's Talk1 (2011–2013)
 Top 20 (2016)
 The Tonight Show with Jay Leno1 (2011–2013)
 Top Gear1 (2012–2013)
 True Beauty1 (2011)
 Try My Life1
 Tuesday War Movies
 The Tyra Banks Show1 (2008–2011)
 Ultimate Style1
 Undercover Boss1 (2012–2013)
 Underemployed
 Unhitched1
 Value Vision (1996–2007)
 The Vampire Diaries1 (2010–2011, 2013–2017)
 Veronica Mars1 (2008)
 Voltron (later on ABS-CBN in 2000)
 Wednesday Sci-Fi Theatre
 Welcome to the Parker1
 What I Like About You1
 What It Takes
 Who Wants to Marry My Dad?1
 Wildfire1
 Will and Grace1
 World News Tonight
 World TV Boxing
 Yan Can Cook
 Broke Back Mountain: The Animated Series

1in cooperation with ETC/Talk TV/Solar News Channel

Defunct shows on ETC/SolarFlix

Local shows
 Chill Spot (2008–2009)
 ETCETERA (2011–2015)
 ETC HQ (2012–2013)
 The Journey to the Crown (2016–2017)
 Rated Oh! (2004–2008)
 Stylized (2014)

Foreign shows
 2 Broke Girls (2011–2017)
 Age of Love
 Ambush Makeover
 American Dreams
 American Idol (2012–2016; 2018-2020)
 America's Next Top Model
 Average Joe
 The Bachelor
 Bachelor Pad
 The Bachelorette
 Bachelorette Party Las Vegas
 Beauty & the Beast (2012–2016)
 Bitten
 Candidly Nicole (2014-2016)
 The Catalina (2013)
 Chelsea Lately (2008–2010)
 The Class
 Cyrus vs. Cyrus: Design and Conquer
 The Daily 10
 Date My Mom
 Dirty Dancing
 The Dish
 E! News
 Ed
 Emily Owens M.D.
 Entertainment Tonight (2004-2007, 2018-2020)
 Entourage
 ETC A-List
 Everwood
 The Expandables
 Everywhere I Go (2020, 2021)
 Extra (2011–2018)
 The F Word
 Faking It
 Famous in Love (2017–2018)
 Fashion Hunters
 The Fashion Show
 For Love or Money
 Freddie
 Friday Night Lights
 Friends (2005–2014)
 Friends to Lovers?
 Friends with Benefits
 Friends with Better Lives (2014)
 Froggy Call
 Gallery Girls
 The Game
 Get Out Of My Room (2020)
 Girls Behaving Badly
 The Girls of the Playboy Mansion
 Glee (2009–2015)
 The Glee Project
 Good Morning, Miami
 Gossip Girl (2007–2012)
 Hayat (2021)
 Hellcats
 Here Come the Newlyweds
 High School Reunion
 House of Carters
 House of Glam
 House of Jazmin
 How I Met Your Mother (2006–2011)
 Is She Really Going Out With Him?
 Jake in Progress (2007–2009)
 Jane the Virgin (2019-21)
 The Jamie Kennedy Experiment
 Joan of Arcadia
 Keeping Up with the Kardashians
 Kitchen Confidential
 Knock First
 Kourtney and Khloé Take Miami
 Last Comic Standing
 Late Night with Conan O'Brien
 LA to Vegas (2018)
 Life Sentence (2018)
 The Lying Game (2012–2014)
Madam Secretary (2020) 
 Make Me a Supermodel
 Meet My Folks
 Millionaire Matchmaker (2009–2016)
 Miss Advised
 Models of the Runway (2010–2013)
 My Boys
 NBC Nightly News (2004–2007)
 New Girl (2011–2018)
 The Next Big Thing: NY
 The Next: Fame Is at Your Doorstep
 Nikita (2011–2014)
 Nip/Tuck (2004–2007)
 The O.C. (2004–2008)
 One Tree Hill (2004–2012)
 The Originals
 Outback Jack
 Parental Control
 Pretty Little Liars (2010–2017)
 Privileged
 Project Accessory
 Project Runway: Fashion Startup (2018)
 Project Runway (2005–present)
 Project Runway Philippines (2008–2015)
 Pussycat Dolls Present: The Search for the Next Doll
 Quarterlife
 Queer Eye For The Straight Guy
 The Rachel Zoe Project (2009–2014)
 Randy Jackson Presents America's Best Dance Crew
 Ravenswood (2013–2014)
 Reign (2013–2017)
 Saturday Night Live
 Scream Queens (2015–2016)
 The Secret Circle
 Sexiest
 Shear Genius
 Significant Others (2004–2007)
 The Simple Life
 Split Ends
 Starting Over
 Step It Up and Dance
 Style Factory
 Sweet Home Oklahoma
 Tim Gunn's Guide to Style
 The Today Show (2004–2005)
 Cyrus vs. Cyrus: Design and Conquer 
 Guest Star 
 Making It 
 Revenge Body with Khloé Kardashian 
 Top Chef Junior  (season 2) 
 TMZ (2008–2018, 2019-2020)
 True Beauty
 Try My Life
 The Tyra Banks Show (2005–2011)
 Ultimate Style
 The Vampire Diaries (2010–2017)
 Veronica Mars (2005–2008)
 Welcome to the Parker
 What I Like About You
 Who Lives Here?
 Who Wants to Marry My Dad?
 Wildfire
 Will and Grace
 The World According to Paris (2012)
 Zoey's Extraordinary Playlist (2020-21)

Sports specials on ETC
 2008 Beijing Olympics

Sports specials
 2008 Beijing Olympics1
 2012 London Olympics13
 Super Bowl 1993
 Cotto Vs. Mayweather HBO Sports 24/7 Documentary Special2 (2012)
 National Cheerleading Championship: 2016 Qualifiers12 (January 23 – February 13, 2016)
 National Cheerleading Championship 2016 National Finals12 (March 19–20, 2016)
 Pacquiao Vs. Marquez HBO Sports 24/7 Documentary Special2 (2011)
 Pacquiao Vs. Mosley HBO Sports 24/7 Documentary Special2 (2011)
 Pacquiao Vs. Rios HBO Sports 24/7 Documentary Special2 (November 2013)

1in cooperation with ETC/Talk TV/Solar News Channel 
2in cooperation with Solar Sports 
3in cooperation with Sports5

Special coverage/TV specials
2000 Today (1999-2000)
 American Idol (season 13) Grand Finale1 (May 22, 2014)
 American Idol (season 14) Grand Finale1 (May 13 and 14, 2015)
 American Idol: The Farewell Season: Grand Finale Week1 (April 6–8, 2016)
 American Idol (season 16) Grand Finale Week1 (May 21 and 22, 2018) 
 American Idol (season 17) Grand Finale1 (May 20, 2019)
 The 59th Annual Grammy Awards 20171 (February 13, 2017)
 The 60th Annual Grammy Awards 20181 (January 29, 2018)
 The 61st Annual Grammy Awards 20191 (February 11, 2019)
 BBC Radio 1's: Big Weekend 20141 (December 21, 2014, re-run May 9, 2015)
 Beyonce: Destined For Stardom (December 12, 2015)
 Coldplay: Ghost Stories1 (December 28, 2014, re-run May 23, 2015)
 Election 20132 (May 10–11, 2013)
 News.PH: Miting de Avance Special1 (May 1 and 8, 2013)
 Impeachment of Renato Corona1 (January 16–May 2012)
 FIRST: The Story of the London 2012 Olympic Games1 (February 23, 2013)
 State of the Nation Address1
 2013 US Presidential Elections Coverage1 (November 2012)
 Congressional Debate on RH Bill1 (December 12 and 17, 2012)
 Ed Sheeran: Live in Dublin1 (February 14, 2015)
 Jason Mraz: Live at the Avocado Ranch1 (December 28, 2014)
 Jason Mraz Special1 (October 25 and 27, 2014)
 JT: Reflections (May 21, 2016)
 Miss Universe 20161 (January 30, 2017)
 Olivia Newton-John: Hopelessly Devoted to You (October 10, 2018)
 Philippine Fashion Week: Spring Summer1 (February 7 and 21, 2016)
 Philippine Fashion Week: Holiday 20161 (July 3 – August 7, 2016)
 Senate Probe on Pork Barrel1 (August–November 2013)
 2012: A Solar News Year End Report1 (December 31, 2012)
 Teen Choice Awards 20141 (August 11, 2014)
 Teen Choice Awards 20151 (August 17, 2015)
 Teen Choice Awards 20161 (August 1, 2016)
 Teen Choice Awards 20171 (August 14, 2017)
 TownHall: Ninoy, The Shot that Rang Out 1 (August 21, 2013)
 TownHall: Throwback Martial Law: Never Again 1 (September 20, 2013)
 TownHall: Aftershocks1 (October 18, 2013)
 Macy's Thanksgiving Day Parade1 (2012-2013)
 Gaga by Gaultier1 (February 14, 2014)
 Sketchers Street Dance Battle Finals Night (2008-2010, 2013-2014)
 Skechers Streetdance Battle : Year 41 (December 14 and 21, 2008)
 Skechers Streetdance Battle : Year 51 (December 13 and 20, 2009)
 Skechers Streetdance Battle : Year 61 (December 12 and 19, 2010)
 Skechers Streetdance Battle : Year 91 (December 8 and 15, 2013)
 Skechers Streetdance Battle : Year 101 (December 7 and 14, 2014)
 MEGA Fashion Crew Reloaded in Paris TV Special1 (June 14, 2014)
 The Today Show Toyota Concert Series1 (May 25 – September 21, 2013) 
 MEGA YDC20 Special1 (April 26, May 3 and 10, 2015)

1in cooperation with ETC/Talk TV/Solar News Channel

See also
Southern Broadcasting Network
Solar Entertainment Corporation
ETC (the former name of Talk TV and Solar News Channel)
List of programs broadcast by ETC

References

Southern Broadcasting Network
Southern Broadcasting Network
Southern Broadcasting Network